Luiz Júnior may refer to:
Luiz Júnior (footballer, born 1989), Qatari football defender
Luiz Júnior (footballer, born 1990), Brazilian football striker
Luiz Júnior (footballer, born 2001), Brazilian footballer goalkeeper